Mitochondrial membrane protein-associated neurodegeneration (MPAN) is a genetic neurodegenerative disease that causes dystonia, parkinsonism, and iron accumulation in the brain. It is caused by mutations to the gene C19orf12, which has unknown function. This was originally discovered as an autosomal recessive disorder, caused by individuals having two mutations to the gene C19orf12, but autosomal dominant disease caused by a single mutation in the same gene has also been rarely described. Due to the common features of neurodegeneration, brain iron accumulation, and movement disorder it is classified as a neurodegeneration with brain iron accumulation (NBIA) disorder and another name for the condition is neurodegeneration with brain iron accumulation 4 (NBIA4).

Signs and symptoms
Symptoms typically begin in childhood and worsen over time. Typical initial features include difficulty walking and dystonia, with later progression to difficulty moving called parkinsonism. Associated problems can include optic nerve atrophy. As movement difficulties worsen, it can cause difficulty swallowing (dysphagia), difficulty speaking (dysarthria), and dementia.

Genetics
MPAN is caused by variants to a single gene, C19orf12, the function of which is not currently known. The more common form is caused by an individual having two dysfunctional copies of C19orf12 which are typically inherited from unaffected parents carrying one mutated copy and one normal copy (carrier status). This is called autosomal recessive inheritance. More rarely described are individuals with a single dysfunctional copy of C19orf12 causing disease, considered to be an autosomal dominant form of the disease that can either be inherited or arise from a de novo mutation.

The protein C19orf12 is not well understood, it is expressed in most cells and is thought to localize to mitochondria and the endoplasmic reticulum.

Diagnosis
MPAN might be suspected with typical presentation and findings on MRI (Magnetic Resonance Imaging), these include evidence of iron deposition in the brain, particularly in the basal ganglia (globus pallidus and substantia nigra). The diagnosis is confirmed by genetic testing identifying harmful variant(s) in C19orf12.

Neuropathology
Pathological findings in brains of people with MPAN include iron deposition and scarring in the globus pallidus, loss of neurons in the substantia nigra, and widespread Lewy bodies and spherical bodies from degenerating neurons.

Management
There are no current treatments or clinical trials for MPAN, so medical treatment focusses on relief of symptoms such as spasticity and dystonia using medications (such as gabapentin, trihexyphenidyl or baclofen), or surgery.

Prognosis
MPAN typically progresses more slowly than other NBIA disorders, and people usually survive into adulthood. As it progresses, people have more difficulty with cognition, speaking, swallowing, movement difficulties, and neuropsychiatric problems.

Epidemiology
Prevalence data regarding this disorder remains incomplete, however it is estimated that less than 1 in 1,000,000 have the disease worldwide. It is more common in Turkish people, due to a founder mutation.

History
MPAN was first described in 2011 in 24 Polish patients with mutations in C19orf12, later confirmed in a further 23 people.

References

External links 

Syndromes affecting the nervous system
Extrapyramidal and movement disorders